Meerssen railway station is located in Meerssen, the Netherlands. The original station building was enlarged in 1900.

Train services
Meerssen station is served by Arriva with the following train services:
Express sneltrein S5: Maastricht–Heerlen
Express sneltrein : Aachen–Maastricht
Local stoptrein S4: Maastricht–Heerlen

Bus services
The following bus services depart from the bus stop outside the station:

 3: Bunde–Meerssen–Rothem–Wittevrouwenveld–Amby–Centraal Station–Wolder
 17: Meerssen–Bunde–Geulle–Beek
 52: Meerssen–Ulestraten–Schimmert–Hulsberg–Klimmen–Voerendaal–Heerlen

References

External links
NS website

Railway stations in Limburg (Netherlands)
Railway stations opened in 1853
Railway stations on the Heuvellandlijn
Meerssen